Victor Willoughby Pickard (October 23, 1903 – January 11, 2001) was a Canadian track and field athlete who competed in the 1924 Summer Olympics and in the 1928 Summer Olympics. In 1924 he finished fifth the pole vault event and 28th in the javelin throw competition. Four years later he finished fourth in the pole vault contest. Pickard won the pole vault event at the 1930 British Empire Games.

References

External links
 

1903 births
2001 deaths
Canadian male pole vaulters
Canadian male javelin throwers
Olympic track and field athletes of Canada
Athletes (track and field) at the 1924 Summer Olympics
Athletes (track and field) at the 1928 Summer Olympics
Athletes (track and field) at the 1930 British Empire Games
Commonwealth Games gold medallists for Canada
Athletes from Hamilton, Ontario
Commonwealth Games medallists in athletics
20th-century Canadian people
21st-century Canadian people
Medallists at the 1930 British Empire Games